Samuel or Sam Crawford may refer to:
 Samuel J. Crawford (1835–1913), U.S. Army general and third Governor of Kansas
 Samuel W. Crawford (1829–1892), U.S. Army surgeon and general
 Samuel Crawford (jurist) (1820–1860), American jurist
 Sam Crawford (1880–1968), American baseball Hall of Fame outfielder
 Sam Crawford (basketball) (born 1970), American basketball player
 Sam Crawford (pitcher) (1892–?), American pitcher and manager in baseball's Negro leagues
 Rusty Crawford (1885–1971), Canadian ice hockey player